The women's 500 m time trial at the 2022 Commonwealth Games was part of the cycling programme, which took place on 31 July 2022.

Records
Prior to this competition, the existing world and Games records were as follows:

Results

References

Women's 500 m time trial
Cycling at the Commonwealth Games – Women's 500 m time trial
Comm